Plašil (feminine: Plašilová) is a Czech surname. Notable people with the surname include:

 Jaroslav Plašil (born 1982), Czech footballer
 Marek Plašil (born 1985), Czech footballer

See also
 

Czech-language surnames